{{DISPLAYTITLE:C11H17NO2}}
The molecular formula C11H17NO2 (molar mass : 195.258 g/mol) may refer to:

 2C-D
 DESOXY
 Dimethoxyamphetamine
 4-Hydroxy-3-methoxymethamphetamine
 Metaterol
 3-Methoxy-4-ethoxyphenethylamine